Brounland is an unincorporated community in Kanawha County, West Virginia, United States.

The community derives its name from Thomas L. Broun, the original owner of the town site.

References 

Unincorporated communities in West Virginia
Unincorporated communities in Kanawha County, West Virginia